Plinia peruviana, commonly known as  (small stemmed jabuticaba) in Brazil, is a species of plant in the family Myrtaceae. It is endemic to central, South America.

Description
Plinia peruviana is a tree that grows to between 4 and 14 metres tall, and is usually found in mixed araucaria forests, on alluvial plains and in open forest. It produces edible fruit, between 18 and 25 mm in diameter, which is dark-purple in colour. Unlike other Jabuticabas the fruits of Plinia peruviana are connected to the tree by long stems, resembling cherries.

Uses
Fruits can be eaten fresh or made into jelly, juice, wine or liqueur. Research has shown that the fruit has potential uses as a dye, flavouring or antioxidant.

Extract from the fruit peel has been shown to be antifungal and protect against copper toxicity.

References

peruviana
Crops originating from the Americas
Crops originating from Brazil
Tropical fruit
Flora of South America
Fruits originating in South America
Cauliflory
Fruit trees
Berries